Boophis albipunctatus is a species of frog in the family Mantellidae.
It is endemic to Madagascar.
Its natural habitats are subtropical or tropical moist lowland forests and rivers.
It is threatened by habitat loss. However, it is not on the endangered list.

References

albipunctatus
Amphibians described in 1993
Endemic frogs of Madagascar
Taxonomy articles created by Polbot